Machine Gun Kelly (musician), or MGK, is an American musician, rapper and actor.

MGK may also refer to:

 MGK Bur (Compact Grenade-launching System, Malogabaritnyi Granatomyotnyi Kompleks), Russia
 National Security Council (Turkey) or Milli Güvenlik Kurulu
 Mawes language of Indonesia (ISO 639-3 code: mgk)
 Mulankunnathukavu railway station, Kerala, India